Zeliha is a Turkish feminine given name. Notable people with the name include:

Zeliha Ağrıs (born 1998), Turkish taekwondo practitioner
Zeliha Atıcıoğlu (born 1963), Azerbaijani sport shooter
Zeliha Şimşek (born 1981), Turkish women's footballer

Turkish feminine given names